Marwan Sherif Badreldin (born 17 April 1999) is a Qatari footballer who plays as a goalkeeper for Al Ahli SC.

Career statistics

Club

Notes

References

External links

1999 births
Living people
Qatari footballers
Qatar Stars League players
Qatari Second Division players
Al Ahli SC (Doha) players
Al-Rayyan SC players
Al-Shahania SC players
Al-Shamal SC players
Association football goalkeepers
Footballers at the 2018 Asian Games
Asian Games competitors for Qatar
Qatar under-20 international footballers
Qatar youth international footballers